Wu Tao (born October 3, 1983 in Liaoning) is a Chinese discus thrower.

He won the 2002 World Junior Championships and the 2003 Summer Universiade and finished seventh at the 2005 Summer Universiade. On the regional level he won the 2003 Asian Championships and the 2002 Asian Games, and finished fifth at the 2006 Asian Games.

He competed at the 2004 Summer Olympics and the 2005 World Championships without reaching the finals.

His personal best throw is 64.28 metres, achieved in May 2005 in Chongqing. The Chinese record is currently held by Li Shaojie with 65.16 metres.

International competitions

References

External links

1983 births
Living people
Athletes from Liaoning
Chinese male discus throwers
Olympic athletes of China
Athletes (track and field) at the 2004 Summer Olympics
Asian Games gold medalists for China
Asian Games medalists in athletics (track and field)
Athletes (track and field) at the 2002 Asian Games
Athletes (track and field) at the 2006 Asian Games
Athletes (track and field) at the 2014 Asian Games
World Athletics Championships athletes for China
Universiade medalists in athletics (track and field)
Medalists at the 2002 Asian Games
Universiade gold medalists for China
Medalists at the 2003 Summer Universiade
21st-century Chinese people